"Love Your Enemies" is the ninth single released by Japanese singer and cellist Kanon Wakeshima. The song was used as an ending theme for the film Selector Destructed WIXOSS. The song peaked at number 24 on the Oricon Singles Chart and stayed on the chart for five weeks.

Track listing

Personnel
 Kanon Wakeshima – Vocals, Cello, Piano, Lyrics

References 

2016 singles
2016 songs
Kanon Wakeshima songs
Warner Music Japan singles
Anime songs
Japanese film songs
Songs written for animated films
Song articles with missing songwriters